The Legendary Pink Dots (aka LPD) are an Anglo-Dutch experimental music band formed in London in August 1980.  In 1984, the band moved to Amsterdam, playing with rotating musicians and having, as core members, singer/songwriter/keyboardist Edward Ka-Spel and keyboardist Phil Knight. In 2022, founding member and synthesist Philip Knight retired from touring, and Randall Frazier (Orbit Service, A Star Too Far) joined the band on synths, samples and electronics.

As of 2022, the group is composed of Edward Ka-Spel (vocals, keyboards, songwriter), Randall Frazier (keyboards, electronics), Erik Drost (guitars) and Joep Hendrikx (live sound engineer).

Their music has incorporated elements from neo-psychedelia, ambient music, electronic music, tape music, psychedelic folk, synthpop, post-punk, progressive jazz, noise music, pop music, goth rock and alternative rock. Although outside the mainstream (in terms of their avant-garde music and non-mainstream career path), LPD have released more than forty albums, have a devoted worldwide following, and tour frequently.

Overview
The band was originally called One Day... but subsequently changed the name to The Legendary Pink Dots. In the 1980s, the band released albums on Mirrordot and InPhaze; in 1985 they signed with Play It Again Sam for the release of The Lovers. The line-up had become stable by 1988, with Niels van Hoornblower (horns) and Bob Pistoor (guitar) joining in time for the band's 1988 US tour. Pistoor died of cancer and his place was filled by Martijn de Kleer; drummer Ryan Moore completed the line-up live and in the studio. Their appeal has always been relatively small—a 1995 show in Mexico in front of 2,500 fans was described as "massive (by Dots' standards)". In 2004, Erik Drost replaced Martijn de Kleer on guitar, and the album The Whispering Wall was released. 

Their music touches on elements of neo-psychedelia, ambient music, electronic music, tape music, psychedelic folk, synthpop, post-punk, progressive, jazz, noise, pop, and goth rock, with a distinctly experimental/avant-garde bent; their sound has evolved over time and remains distinctive, making it difficult to place the group into a concise style or genre. The group's overall sound combined with Ka-Spel's distinct lyrics and singing have earned comparisons to Pink Floyd and Syd Barrett; the group also has links to the sounds of krautrock bands such as Can, Faust, Brainticket and Neu! (whose "Super" they covered on the 1999 tribute album "A Homage to NEU!"), as well as the music of Magma.

Related bands
The Pink Dots frequently collaborated with Skinny Puppy's cEvin Key, forming a side project named The Tear Garden. Key also played drums on several tracks of the 1994 LPD album 9 Lives to Wonder. 

Ryan Moore, who drummed on studio and live performances for the Legendary Pink Dots, left to work on his own musical outlet, the Twilight Circus Dub Sound System. He wrote and produced albums for Michael Rose of Black Uhuru, and has worked with other reggae figures such as Sly Dunbar.

The Pink Dots have influenced a wide range of bands, such as The Dresden Dolls, MGMT, Orbit Service, and Skinny Puppy.

In 2017, Edward Ka-Spel released "I Can Spin A Rainbow" with The Dresden Dolls front-woman Amanda Palmer, and former Legendary Pink Dot Patrick Q. Wright. The release was followed by a US Tour and a European Tour. It's worth noting that on the US tour, Randall Frazier was sound engineer, and on the European tour, Joep Hendrikx was sound engineer, both members of The Legendary Pink Dots.

Discography

References

External links
 LegendaryPinkDots.org - Official LPD Online Centraal: news, discography, etc.
 The Legendary Pink Dots' Bandcamp page - Featuring a large proportion of their discography, including download-only albums and recent remasters.

English gothic rock groups
English experimental musical groups
English post-punk music groups
English synth-pop groups
Musical groups established in 1980
Musical groups from London
Psychedelic folk groups
Soleilmoon artists
Third Mind Records artists
In Phaze Records artists